Østre Innlandet District Court is a district court located in Innlandet county, Norway. This court is based at three different courthouses which are located in Elverum, Hamar, and Tynset. The court serves the eastern part of the county which includes cases from 17 municipalities. The court in Elverum accepts cases from the municipalities of Elverum, Trysil, Våler, Åmot, and Åsnes. The court in Hamar accepts cases from the municipalities of Hamar, Løten, Ringsaker, and Stange. The court in Tynset accepts cases from the municipalities of Alvdal, Engerdal, Folldal, Os, Rendalen, Stor-Elvdal, Tolga, and Tynset. The court is subordinate to the Eidsivating Court of Appeal.

The court is led by a chief judge and several other judges. The court is a court of first instance.  Its judicial duties are mainly to settle criminal cases and to resolve civil litigation as well as bankruptcy. The administration and registration tasks of the court include death registration, issuing certain certificates, performing duties of a notary public, and officiating civil wedding ceremonies.  Cases from this court are heard by a combination of professional judges and lay judges.  Cases from this district court may be appealed to the Eidsivating Court of Appeal.

History
This court was established on 26 April 2021 after the old Hedmarken District Court, Nord-Østerdal District Court and Sør-Østerdal District Court were all merged into one court. The new district court system continues to use the courthouses from the predecessor courts.

References

District courts of Norway
2021 establishments in Norway
Organisations based in Hamar
Organisations based in Elverum
Organisations based in Tynset